Diacrochordon is a fungal genus in the class Sordariomycetes. The relationship of this taxon to other taxa within the class is unknown (incertae sedis). It is a monotypic genus containing the single species Diacrochordon rehmii, described as new to science in 1955 by mycologist Franz Petrak.

References

Monotypic Sordariomycetes genera
Sordariomycetes enigmatic taxa